Contempo can refer to:

Contempo: A Review of Books and Personalities
Fender Contempo Organ
University of Chicago Contemporary Chamber Players
Contempo Casuals, a former women's clothing retailer that was acquired by Wet Seal
Contempo (band), the former band of Richard Archer from Hard-Fi